Burcu Esmersoy (born 2 October 1976) is a Turkish anchorwoman, journalist, model, occasional actress, and former beauty pageant contestant who represented her nation at Miss International in Japan. She received a Golden Butterfly for Best Female Presenter. Burcu Esmersoy is one of Turkey's leading female reality show hosts and highest-paid television personalities. Amongst the Turkish television shows hosted by Esmersoy are Ver Fırına, Survivor, Popstar, Nedir Ne Değildir, Late Summer Night with Burcu Esmersoy, Komedi Türkiye, En Güzel Bölüm, Elin Oğlu, and Dancing with the Stars. As an actress, she starred in Romantik Komedi (2010), Dedektif Memoli (2011), as Aylin Youlin in Çocuklar Duymasın (2012), and as special guest star Melda in Bir Erkek Bir Kadın (2013), Turkish adaptation of the French-language Canadian comedy television series Un gars, une fille.

Burcu Esmersoy has been the face of a variety of advertising campaigns. Since her debut, she has also appeared in numerous magazine covers, articles, and editorials across Turkey.

Early life and education
Esmersoy was born in Istanbul to parents of Circassian descent whose parents were from Egypt. In an interview in 2020, Esmersoy revealed that she had been physically abused and beaten by her father in her childhood, who would hit her with a hose. Her parents divorced as her father's affair with another woman came to light. Following her mother's second marriage, Esmersoy and her sister were forced to refer to their mother as 'aunt' instead of 'mom' and became distanced from her as they moved in with their paternal grandparents.

After finishing her secondary studies at Beşiktaş Lisesi, a prestigious high school located on the European side of Istanbul, she enrolled in the Tourism Management Department of the Faculty of Business Management at Istanbul University. Following her graduation, she went on to study Hospitality, Tourism, and Sports Management at Tisch Center, New York University School of Professional Studies.

In addition to her full-time studies, Burcu Esmersoy took part in Barbara Poitier's performing art workshops at Istanbul Bilgi University. She is also an alumna of Dialog Anlatım İletişim.

Besides Turkish, Burcu Esmersoy speaks average English and Italian.

Career
In 1997, she was placed third runner-up at the Miss Turkey beauty pageant. The same year she represented Turkey at Miss International in Tokyo, Japan where she won the "Miss Friendship" title. She began her broadcasting career in a children's programme aired on Kanal D and joined CNN Türk's Sports News in 2000 and worked there until 2005 as sports presenter, coordinator as well as foreign news editor. In April 2006, she joined NTV MSNBC and started presenting the Spor Servisi programme.

She competed in the first season of the reality show Dancing with the Stars (2010–2011) and hosted the second season (2011–2012) of the same competition. In 2013, she hosted Popstar, based on the British television music competition Pop Idol. She also hosted TV8's Ver Fırına, Turkish version of the British television baking competition The Great British Bake Off and co-hosted ATV's Elin Oğlu, based on the South Korean talk show Non-Summit.

Personal life
On 28 February 2005, Burcu Esmersoy married Scuderia Ferrari Formula One's sponsorship and marketing manager Massimo Cusimano at the Turkish Consulate-General in Paris, France and later in Bologna on 28 October 2006. For a short span of time, Burcu Esmersoy lived in Maranello, Emilia-Romagna which is the home of Ferrari S.p.A. The couple divorced in 2008. From May 2018 to September 2019, Esmersoy was married to Berk Suyabatmaz.

Filmography

Film

Television

References

External links
 
 Burcu Esmersoy on Gaye Sökmen Ajans

1976 births
Living people
Istanbul University alumni
Miss International 1997 delegates
New York University alumni
Models from Istanbul
Turkish television actresses
Turkish beauty pageant winners
Turkish broadcast news analysts
Turkish female models
Turkish game show hosts
Turkish people of Circassian descent
Turkish sports journalists
Turkish television news anchors
Turkish television talk show hosts
Television people from Istanbul